HMS Roxburgh was one of six  armoured cruisers built for the Royal Navy in the first decade of the 20th century. She was assigned to the 1st Cruiser Squadron of the Channel Fleet upon completion and was transferred to the reserve Third Fleet in 1909. She was then assigned to the 5th Cruiser Squadron of the reserve Second Fleet in 1912 and the 3rd Cruiser Squadron the following year.

Upon mobilisation in mid-1914 her squadron was assigned to the Grand Fleet and spent much of its time patrolling the northern exits from the North Sea and the Norwegian coast. She was torpedoed in mid-1915 by a German submarine and repairs took almost a year. Roxburgh was transferred to the North America and West Indies Station in mid-1916 and spent the rest of the war escorting convoys. She rammed a German submarine while escorting a convoy in early 1918. The ship was reduced to reserve in 1919, but recommissioned later that year for use as a radio training ship. Roxburgh was paid off in 1920 and sold for scrap the following year.

Design and description
Roxburgh was designed to displace . The engines were powered by seventeen Dürr and six cylindrical boilers.

Her main armament consisted of four breech-loading (BL) 7.5-inch Mk I guns mounted in four single-gun turrets, one each fore and aft of the superstructure and one on each side. Her secondary armament of six BL 6-inch Mk VII guns was arranged in casemates amidships. Four of these were mounted on the main deck and were only usable in calm weather. Roxburgh also carried 18 quick-firing (QF) 3-pounder Hotchkiss guns and two submerged 18-inch torpedo tubes. Her two 12-pounder 8 cwt guns could be dismounted for service ashore.

At some point in the war, the main deck six-inch guns of the Devonshire-class ships were moved to the upper deck and given gun shields. Their casemates were plated over to improve seakeeping and the four 3-pounder guns displaced by the transfer were landed.

The armour of the gun turrets was also five inches thick whilst that of their barbettes was six inches thick.

Construction and service

Roxburgh, named to commemorate the Scottish county, was laid down at the Govan shipyard of the London and Glasgow Shipbuilding Company on 13 June 1902. Construction was slowed owing to problems with delivery of her boilers, with the ship being launched on 19 January 1904 and completed on 5 September 1905. She was initially assigned to the 1st Cruiser Squadron of the Channel Fleet together with most of her sister ships and remained with the squadron until beginning a refit at Devonport Royal Dockyard in December 1908. Upon its completion in August 1909, she was assigned to the reserve Third Fleet. In June 1912 the ship was transferred to the 3rd Cruiser Squadron of the Second Fleet.

The squadron was assigned to the Grand Fleet in mid-1914 as the Navy mobilised for war. It spent much of its time with the Grand Fleet reinforcing the patrols near the Shetland and Faeroe Islands and the Norwegian coast where she captured a German merchantman on 6 August. On 18 June 1915, Roxburgh was part of a force of cruisers from the 3rd Cruiser Squadron and the 2nd Light Cruiser Squadron, accompanied by destroyers, that set out from Rosyth on a patrol across the North Sea. The ship was under repair until April 1916. She patrolled the Norwegian coast in April 1916 and was then transferred to the North America and West Indies Station in September for convoy escort duties. The ship was reduced to reserve at Plymouth Royal Dockyard in June 1919, but was recommissioned later that year for use as a radio training ship. Roxburgh was paid off in February 1920 and sold for scrap on 8 November 1921.

Notes

Footnotes

Bibliography

External links
 

 

Devonshire-class cruisers (1903)
Ships built on the River Clyde
1904 ships
World War I cruisers of the United Kingdom